Reidun Brusletten (born 29 November 1936 in Oslo) is a Norwegian politician for the Christian Democratic Party. She served as the first Minister of International Development from 1983 to 1986. She was also a deputy member in the Storting for Buskerud from 1977 to 1981.

References

1936 births
Living people
Politicians from Oslo
Christian Democratic Party (Norway) politicians
Ministers of International Development of Norway
Women government ministers of Norway
20th-century Norwegian women politicians
20th-century Norwegian politicians